The SS Dunraven was built in Newcastle upon Tyne at the C. Mitchell and C. Iron Ship Builders and was launched in 1872. The ship was owned by a Mr W. Milburn. Powered by both sail and steam, she was planned for the route from Britain to Bombay. 

Three years later, in January 1876, she set sail from Liverpool loaded with steel and timber bound for Bombay. There the cargo was sold and she was reloaded with spices, cotton and muslin for the return journey. It was generally an uneventful journey and she reached the Red Sea approaches to the Suez Canal on 25 April. Thinking they were further up the Gulf of Suez than they actually were, Captain Care and the 25-man crew sailed the ship straight into a reef. The ship stuck fast south of Beacon Rock at the southern end of the furthest reaches of what is now the Ras Muhammad National Park on the outside of Sha'ab Mahmoud. The crew worked frantically to dislodge her, and 14 hours after striking the rock she slid off. This motion upset her balance and she capsized.

She sunk quickly in 25 metres of water, leaving the crew to be rescued from the life boats by local fishermen. After the incident the British Board of Trade held an enquiry and found Captain Care to have been at fault. The board declared him negligent and revoked his captain's license, the Master's Certificate, for a year.

The Dunraven wreck was discovered by several local Scuba Divers working out of Sharm el Sheikh. One of them was Howard Rosenstein owner and manager of the Red Sea Divers center in 1977.

Dive site
The wreck was known to local fishermen for generations, as the shallow depth would cause their nets to snag, but it was only rediscovered to the world at large in 1977 by a German Oil company employee. The ship was dived on soon afterwards, and many wide theories appeared — for example, that it was a World War I ship that operated on behalf of Lawrence of Arabia. Then a piece of porcelain was found with the name SS Dunraven. Legends still surround the wreck; there are stories of the wreck being caused by an argument between the drunk Captain and his promiscuous wife.

Since its rediscovery the wreck has become a popular dive site because of its shallow depth. The wreck has largely broken up as it lies upside down upon the reef, but there are three large holes in the hull which allow divers to penetrate the wreck and examine the two large boilers and a host of fallen metal work. In part owing to the shallow depth, an abundance of reef fish can be found: Glassfish, Groupers, Jackfish, Scorpionfish and Crocodilefish can all be seen around the ruptures in the hull.

See also
List of shipwrecks in 1876

Shipwrecks in the Red Sea
Steamships of the United Kingdom
Wreck diving sites
Maritime incidents in April 1876
1872 ships